Javier Saavedra Vázquez (born 13 March 1973) is a Mexican former professional footballer who played as a midfielder.

Career
Saavedra started his career in 1996 with Toros Neza, where he reached a final. He was transferred to Tigres in 2000, and then played for Morelia for a short while in 2002, returning to Tigres in 2003, moving to Chiapas for a short period in 2006, until finally returning to Tigres in 2007.

He has reached 5 finals, two of those finals have been with Tigres and another two with Morelia.

Saavedra has been one of the best players even when the team is not playing good at all, Saavedra was bench at the start of the season this year, he didn't start any games until the fifth game and in his comeback game he got 2 assists and one goal defeating the team that has been marked as "the best in mexico" 3–2, since then he has started all games and now he has 4 assists in 4 games which makes him one of the most efficient players in the team and with him, the team has 7 points out of 12 possible, and before that the team only had 1 point out of 15. On May 2, 2009, Saavedra scored the game-winning goal against Cruz Azul, the goal saved Indios from relegating to the Primera División A.

On May 8, 2010, Javier won a bi-championship with Necaxa and helped it return to Mexico's First Division.

He played for the Mexico national team during the administration of Manuel Lapuente.

Saavedra signed with expansion San Antonio Scorpions FC of the North American Soccer League on January 24, 2012. and Retired in January 2015.

References

External links
 
 

1973 births
Living people
Mexican expatriate footballers
Mexican footballers
Mexico international footballers
1997 Copa América players
Tigres UANL footballers
Atlético Morelia players
Chiapas F.C. footballers
Indios de Ciudad Juárez footballers
Club Necaxa footballers
Irapuato F.C. footballers
San Antonio Scorpions players
Footballers from Michoacán
Expatriate soccer players in the United States
Liga MX players
North American Soccer League players
Toros Neza footballers
Association football midfielders